Drama Club is an American comedy mockumentary created by Monica Sherer and Madeline Whitby that aired on Nickelodeon from March 20 to May 22, 2021.

Premise 
The Tookus Middle School Drama Club has Mack as the new student director, who is excited to take on the school's original new musical, "Minnesota", but after their choreographer suffers an injury, Mack and the kids realized that they need help from a football player.

Cast and characters

Main 
 Telci Huynh as Mack, a former actor in the Drama Club who has transitioned to directing the student production
 Nathan Janak as Oliver, the "star actor" in Drama Club
 Lili Brennan as Darcy, the stage manager, and Mack's best friend and cheerleader in the Drama Club
 Kensington Tallman as Bianca, a social influencer who has become the Drama Club's female lead
 Chase Vacnin as Bench, a football player who is brought into Drama Club because he is a classically trained dancer
 Artyon Celestine as Skip, an enthusiastic member of the Drama Club, with a single line in the musical production, who is excited by Bench's addition to the Club

Recurring 
 John Milhiser as Clyde Sniffet, Drama Club's laid-back faculty advisor
 Neska Rose as Gertie, Drama Club's laconic makeup artist
 Reyn Doi as Kurtis, Drama Club's self-absorbed lighting designer
 Ithmar Enriquez as Principal Gibbins, the new Tookus Middle School principal who has come back to get revenge on Drama Club for destroying his dreams of becoming an actor
 Marcus Folmar as Coach Cobbler, the football coach who forces Bench to join Drama Club as an elective
 Pilot Bunch as Colin, Mack's lab partner in chemistry on whom she may have a crush

Production and release 
Drama Club consists of ten half-hour episodes. Episodes of the series premiered on the Nick app and Nick.com a week before they were broadcast on Nickelodeon, starting with the first episode which premiered on the Nick app and Nick.com on March 13, 2021, and on Nickelodeon on March 20, 2021.

Episodes 
Episodes were released on the Nick app and Nick.com a week before they were broadcast on Nickelodeon.

Ratings 
 
}}

Notes

References

External links 
 
 

2021 American television series debuts
2021 American television series endings
2020s American comedy television series
2020s Nickelodeon original programming
English-language television shows
Awesomeness (company)